Jagannathan Sarangapani from the University of Missouri, Rolla, MO was named Fellow of the Institute of Electrical and Electronics Engineers (IEEE) in 2016 for contributions to nonlinear discrete-time neural network adaptive control and applications.

References 

Fellow Members of the IEEE
Living people
Year of birth missing (living people)
Missouri University of Science and Technology faculty
American electrical engineers